Aquila Walsh (15 May 1823 – 6 March 1885) was a Canadian civil engineer, politician, and civil servant.

Walsh was born in Charlotteville Township in 1823, the son of Francis Leigh Walsh and grandson of Thomas Welch. He represented Norfolk in the Legislative Assembly of the Province of Canada from 1861 until 1867. In 1867, he was elected to the House of Commons of Canada for the Ontario riding of Norfolk North. A Conservative, he was defeated in 1872 and 1878. He was reeve of Simcoe from 1857 to 1859 and mayor in 1882. In 1882, he was appointed commissioner of crown lands for Manitoba. He died in Winnipeg, Manitoba in 1885.

His son William L. Walsh served as Lieutenant Governor of Alberta from 1931 to 1936.

References
 
 

1823 births
1885 deaths
Conservative Party of Canada (1867–1942) MPs
Members of the House of Commons of Canada from Ontario
Members of the Legislative Assembly of the Province of Canada from Canada West
Mayors of places in Ontario
People from Norfolk County, Ontario